Carpin is a municipality in the Mecklenburgische Seenplatte district, in Mecklenburg-Vorpommern, Germany.

Geography 
The municipality of Carpin lies within the Feldberg Lake District Nature Park, the southern part of the offshoot of the Müritz National Park with its 101 metre high Galgenberg hill and the lake of Schweingartensee east of Neustrelitz. The region is characterised by other lakes in the Mecklenburg Lake District, such as the Schweingartensee and Lake Carpin, as well as a gently rolling countryside which is densely wooded to the west.

References 

Municipalities in Mecklenburg-Western Pomerania
Grand Duchy of Mecklenburg-Strelitz